Telefon is a 1977 spy film directed by Don Siegel and starring Charles Bronson, Lee Remick and Donald Pleasence. The screenplay by Peter Hyams and Stirling Silliphant is based on the 1975 novel by Walter Wager.

Plot
After the Cuban Missile Crisis, the Soviet Union planted a number of long-term, deep-cover sleeper agents all over the United States, spies so thoroughly brainwashed that even they did not know they were agents. They can be activated only by a special code phrase – a line from the Robert Frost poem "Stopping by Woods on a Snowy Evening" – followed by the agent's real first name. Their mission was to sabotage crucial parts of the civil and military infrastructure in the event of war.

More than 20 years pass, and the Cold War gradually gives way to détente. Nikolai Dalchimsky, a rogue KGB headquarters clerk, travels to America, taking with him the Telefon Book, which contains the names, addresses and telephone numbers of all the sleeper agents. He starts activating them, one by one. American counterintelligence is thrown into confusion when seemingly ordinary citizens start blowing up facilities that were once important, but now have little, if any, value. The agents either commit suicide or die in the act itself.

The KGB does not dare tell its political leaders, much less the Americans, about its negligence in not deactivating the spy network. KGB Major Grigori Borzov, selected in part for his photographic memory, memorizes the contents of the only other copy of the Telefon Book and is sent to find and stop Dalchimsky quietly, before either side learns what is happening and possibly starts a war. Borzov is given the assistance of only a single agent, Barbara, planted in America years before.

Eventually, Borzov realizes the method behind Dalchimsky's pattern of attacks: he has chosen the agents by the first letters of their American hometowns, "writing" his own name in sabotage across America. Borzov is thus able to anticipate Dalchimsky's next chosen agent and kills Dalchimsky.

However, there are a number of twists. Barbara has orders from the KGB to assassinate Borzov once he succeeds, to get rid of a dangerous loose end. In addition, she is a double agent actually working for America. When she informs her American superior, Sandburg, he also tells her to kill Borzov, so she will retain the confidence of the KGB. However, Barbara has fallen in love with her would-be target. She informs Borzov, and together they blackmail both sides into leaving them alone, holding the threat of the remaining Telefon agents over their heads.

Cast

Charles Bronson as Major Grigori Borzov
Lee Remick as Barbara
Donald Pleasence as Nikolai Dalchimsky
Tyne Daly as Dorothy Putterman
Alan Badel as Colonel Malchenko
Patrick Magee as General Strelsky
Sheree North as Marie Wills
Frank Marth as Harley Sandburg
Helen Page Camp as Emma Stark
Roy Jenson as Doug Stark
Jacqueline Scott as Mrs. Hassler
Ed Bakey as Carl Hassler
John Mitchum as Harry Bascom
Iggie Wolfington as Father Stuart Diller
Hank Brandt as William Enders
John Carter as Stroller
Burton Gilliam as Gas Station Attendant
Regis Cordic as Doctor
Carmen Zapata as Nurse
Kathleen O'Malley as Mrs Maloney
Åke Lindman as Lt. Alexandrov
Ansa Ikonen as Dalchimsky's Mother
George O. Petrie as Hotel Receptionist
Robert Phillips as 1st Highway Patrolman
Cliff Emmich as 2nd Highway Patrolman
Ville-Veikko Salminen as Russian Steward
James Nolan as Appliance Store Clerk
Derek Rydall as Mrs. Wills' Child
Michael Byrne as Soviet Military Officer (uncredited)

Production

Development
MGM bought the film rights to the novel in October 1974. The novel was published in April 1975. The New York Times called the novel "a doozie of a thriller".

Peter Bellwood was the first writer. Then Peter Hyams wrote a script. Hyams says Dan Melnick then head of MGM told him he wanted Hyams to write and direct, but his last film Peeper had flopped and Hyams said "he knew there was no way he was going to let me direct it." They did like the script but brought in Richard Lester to direct. Hyams rewrote the script for Lester, who then left the project and Don Siegel came on board. Hyams would leave to make Capricorn One and Stirling Silliphant rewrote the script.

In August 1976 it was announced Don Siegel would direct and Charles Bronson would star. Siegel had directed Bronson in TV in the late 50s and said "I wanted to do this one because of Bronson. I think we would make a natural team."

Bronson's wife Jill Ireland often worked with her husband and Bronson said the female lead was "perfect for her" but he did not insist and Lee Remick was cast instead.

Filming
Principal photography began in January 1977.

Some of the film was shot in Finland, which doubled for Russia. A magazine in the Soviet Union ran an article critical of the film, claiming it aimed to stir up trouble and demonised the Russians. Don Siegel denied this saying the film was "pro Russia and pro peace."

"I have to face the fact the story is cockamamie at best," said Siegel. "So I've been particularly painstaking to give the movie a feeling of authenticity."

The city skyline depicting Houston, where part of the story line occurred, is actually that of Great Falls, Montana, where the majority of the film was shot. During filming, the crew had to order two truckloads of snow needed for one of the scenes, because the chinook winds in the area took away the snow they had. They were trucked from the mountains. Filming in downtown Great Falls was also included. The exploding building in one scene is actually the controlled demolition of the old Paris Gibson Junior High School. The explosion scene was filmed on February 20, 1977. The present day Paris Gibson square was undamaged, but the explosion started roof fires on a couple of nearby houses that were quickly extinguished by city firefighters hired by the movie company on stand by.

The Houston scenes were shot on a Hollywood backlot, while the interior of the Houston Hyatt Regency was portrayed by 5 Embarcadero Center in San Francisco, California – the location which was also used in The Towering Inferno.

The scenes with fires and explosions at a rocket engine test site were filmed at Rocketdyne's Santa Susana Field Laboratory in the mountains northwest of Los Angeles.

According to director Siegel, actress Lee Remick was terrified of Charles Bronson, and when asked to touch his face during a scene, responded, "I don't dare. He'll bite me!"

As parts of the film were shot in Finland, there are several cameo appearances by Finnish movie stars, most notably Ansa Ikonen.

Reception

Critical response
Vincent Canby of The New York Times wrote, "Though there are action sequences in 'Telefon,' they are never sustained, and the screenplay only occasionally comes up with witty substitutes for the missing plausibility. However, to describe 'Telefon' as synthetic is to take it more seriously than it's taken by anyone connected with it." Arthur D. Murphy of Variety called the film "pleasant escapism" with a story that "runs its interesting if predictable course until fadeout romantic clinch as the stars tell their respective employers to let them live in peace somewhere nice and idyllic, which by this time is really asking too much of audiences." Gene Siskel of the Chicago Tribune gave the film 3 stars out of 4 and wrote that it "is by no means a great picture — just solid action held together by a string of explosions. In other words, it's a good movie to eat popcorn by." Kevin Thomas of the Los Angeles Times called the film "a sleek diversion that hasn't much more to it than a routine TV movie." Gary Arnold of The Washington Post stated, "The real problem is that the filmmakers lay out this story blueprint so doggedly that the audience is invariably 25 pages of expository chitchat ahead of them. Following 'Telefon' is about as thrilling as being kept on hold for the better part of the day." Richard Combs of The Monthly Film Bulletin wrote, "This dismal attempt to ring some changes in the spy genre—the protagonist is a KGB agent, his mission is to preserve East-West cordiality—is fatally undercut both by its surprisingly lukewarm plot and unengaged characters and by the fact that its updating is already out of date, Russian-American détente having sprung many leaks." James Monaco wrote that Telefon don't do much but play with paranoia.

"It was a typical Siegel film," Siegel said later. "It made absolutely no sense. I did the film because basically I'm a whore."

The film holds a score of 40% on Rotten Tomatoes based on 15 reviews.

Quentin Tarantino later wrote that "just because the premise is nutty doesn’t mean it’s bad. In fact, it’s far out enough that in the right hands, it could have been a stone gas. But those right hands definitely didn’t belong to old fart Siegel, who blew the picture’s chance for success by de-emphasizing the kooky elements and emphasizing the dull ones. Siegel not only wasted his time, he wasted the Stirling Silliphant and Peter Hyams (who should have directed) script."

See also

 The Naked Gun: From the Files of Police Squad!, a comedy film whose plot borrows heavily from Telefon.
 Conspiracy thriller

References

Notes

External links
 
 
 

1977 films
1970s spy films
1970s psychological thriller films
American spy films
American thriller films
Cold War spy films
Films about the Central Intelligence Agency
Films about the KGB
Films based on American novels
Films based on thriller novels
Films directed by Don Siegel
Films set in Calgary
Films set in Colorado
Films set in Florida
Films set in Houston
Films set in Langley, Virginia
Films set in Los Angeles
Films set in Montana
Films set in Moscow
Films set in New Mexico
Films set in Santa Monica, California
Films set in the Soviet Union
Films set in Texas
Films shot in Finland
Films shot in Montana
Metro-Goldwyn-Mayer films
Films about altered memories
Films scored by Lalo Schifrin
Films with screenplays by Stirling Silliphant
Films with screenplays by Peter Hyams
1970s English-language films
1970s American films